Origanum dictamnus, the dittany of Crete, Cretan dittany or hop marjoram, is a tender perennial plant that grows 20–30 cm high. It is known in Greek as δίκταμο (díktamo, cf. "dittany") or in the Cretan dialect as έρωντας (erontas, "love"). It is a therapeutic and aromatic plant that grows wild only on the mountainsides and gorges of the Greek island of Crete. It is widely used for food flavouring and medicinal purposes, in addition to featuring as an ornamental plant in gardens. This small, lanate shrub is easily recognised by the distinctive soft, woolly covering of white-grey hair on its stems and round green leaves, giving it a velvety texture. Its tiny rose-pink flowers are surrounded by brighter purple-pink bracts in summer and autumn.  The dittany is classified as vulnerable on the IUCN Red List of Threatened Plant Species 1997.

Description
Origanum dictamnus is a many branched plant with discoid to ovate, grey-green leaves that are sited in pairs opposite each other. The slender arching stems and lanate leaves are covered in a velvety white down and are 13–25 mm in size.

The flowers are pale pink to purple and have a deep lilac corolla with many deep pink coloured overlapping bracts. The colourful flowers forming a cascade of elongated clusters are in bloom in the summer months. The flowers are hermaphrodite, meaning they have both male and female organs, and are pollinated by bees attracted to their scent and bright colour.

The primary ingredients of its essential oil were found to be carvacrol (68.96%), β-phellandrene (18.34%) and p-cymene (4.68%).

History
Said to symbolize love and to be an aphrodisiac, only the most ardent young lovers scrambled on mountainsides and the deep gorges of Crete gathering bunches of the pink blooms to present as love tokens. In antiquity, the herb was used to flavor wine, decorate temples and gardens, and as a medicinal panacea. There are numerous deaths reported throughout the centuries by collectors of this magical herb. 

Even in recent times, the collection of dittany of Crete was a very dangerous occupation for the men who risked life and limb to climb precarious rock faces where the plant grows wild in the mountains of Crete. They were named erondades (love seekers) and were considered very passionate men to go to such dangerous lengths to collect the herb.

Dittany of Crete has always been highly prized; it is gathered while in bloom in the summer months, and is exported for use in pharmaceuticals, perfumery and to flavour drinks such as vermouth and absinthe.

In Ancient Greece, Hippocrates prescribed plant cures to aid all manner of ailments, and considered dittany of Crete useful for stomach aches and complaints of the digestive system and as a poultice for healing wounds, as well as inducing menstruation.

The Greek philosopher Aristotle in his work The History of Animals (612a4) wrote: "Wild goats in Crete are said, when wounded by arrow, to go in search of dittany,  which is supposed to have the property of ejecting arrows in the body."

The Greek scholar and philosopher Theophrastus agreed with Aristotle about the healing properties of dittany of Crete.  In his work Enquiry into Plants, he noted that dittany was peculiar to Crete, and that it was "said to be true, that, if goats eat it when they have been shot, it rids them of the arrow" (9.16.1).

Other scholars of Ancient Greece and later have made reference to dittany, but probably referred to Dictamnus albus, known as false or white dittany.

Today, the wild, naturally grown dittany of Crete is classed as "rare" and is protected by European law so it does not become extinct. The cultivation now centres on Embaros and the surrounding villages, south of Heraklion, Crete, and is used to make herbal tea and for use in natural beauty products.

Fiction
In Book XII.411–415 of Virgil's Aeneid, Venus heals the wounded Aeneas with dittany: “Hereupon Venus, smitten by her son’s cruel pain, with a mother’s care plucks from Cretan Ida a dittany stalk, [dictamnum genetrix Cretaea carpi ab Ida (412)] clothed with downy leaves and purple flowers; not unknown is that herb to wild goats, when winged arrows have lodged in their flanks.” (Loeb translation).

In Canto XI of Tasso's Jerusalem Delivered the crusader leader, Godfrey, is healed by a dittany salve. This scene is a reference to Virgil's as the dittany used to heal Godfrey is fetched from Mount Ida and reference is also made to the idea that goats eat dittany when wounded.

Charles Baudelaire, in the poem, Tout entière, the 43rd poem in his collection, Les Fleurs du Mal, describes his lover as consisting entirely of dittany: Elle tout est dictame (line 11), she is entirely dittany, referring to the literary tradition of Virgil and Tasso, except that the wound Baudelaire suffers from is not as literal as those that plague Aeneas or Godfrey.

In Harry Potter and the Deathly Hallows, Hermione uses dittany to cure Ron after he was Splinched while Apparating. later it was used to heal burns after Harry, Hermione and Ron were injured in their raid on Bellatrix Lestrange's vault.

The book: The Honey Farm on the Hill by Jo Thomas. This fiction love story takes place in Crete and is essentially all about the preservation of the plant Dittany.

In the film Hereditary, the protagonist is tricked into a tea laced with dittany because it purportedly helps make the consumer more susceptible to demonic possession.

In Circe, the titular character finds dittany, described as the "queen of healing", amongst other ingredients on Mount Dicte in order to create a binding charm that would reduce the insatiable hunger of the Minotaur to three months of the year.

Aroma profile 
 Carvacrol
 Cymene
 Thymol

Toxicology 
 Antimicrobial activity against Listeria monocytogenes.

References

External links

dictamnus
Flora of Greece
Plants described in 1753
Taxa named by Carl Linnaeus